Iyar may refer to:

Iyar, the eighth month of the civil year (which starts on 1 Tishrei) and the second month of the Jewish religious year (which starts on 1 Nisan) on the Hebrew calendar.
Iyare Igiehon (born 1974), British DJ, Radio personality, and filmmaker
Subrah Iyar (born 1957), Indian entrepreneur

See also
Ayar (disambiguation)
Mimana Iyar Chronicle, role-playing video game